was a Japanese writer and a major figure in contemporary Japanese literature. His novels, short stories and essays, strongly influenced by French and American literature and literary theory, deal with political, social and philosophical issues, including nuclear weapons, nuclear power, social non-conformism, and existentialism. Ōe was awarded the 1994 Nobel Prize in Literature for creating "an imagined world, where life and myth condense to form a disconcerting picture of the human predicament today".

Early life and education
The third of seven children, he grew up listening to his grandmother, a storyteller of myths and folklore, who also recounted the oral history of the two uprisings in the region before and after the Meiji Restoration. His father, Kōtare Ōe, had a bark-stripping business; the bark was used to make paper currency. After his father died in the Pacific War in 1944, his mother, Koseki, became the driving force behind his education, buying him books including The Adventures of Huckleberry Finn and The Wonderful Adventures of Nils, which had a formative influence on him.

Ōe received the first ten years of his education in local public schools. He started school during the peak of militarism in Japan; in class, he was forced to pronounce his loyalty to Emperor Hirohito, who his teacher claimed was a god. After the war, he realized he had been taught lies and felt betrayed. This sense of betrayal later appeared in his writing.

Ōe attended high school in Matsuyama from 1951 to 1953, where he excelled as a student. At the age of 18, he made his first trip to Tokyo, where he studied at a prep school (yobikō) for one year. The following year, he began studying French Literature at Tokyo University with Professor Kazuo Watanabe, a specialist on François Rabelais.

Career 
Ōe began publishing stories in 1957, while still a student, strongly influenced by contemporary writing in France and the United States. His first work to be published was "Lavish are the Dead", a short story set in Tokyo during the American occupation, which appeared in Bungakukai literary magazine. His early works were set in his own university milieu.

In 1958, his short story "Shiiku" (飼育) was awarded the prestigious Akutagawa Prize. The work was about a black GI set upon by Japanese youth, and was later made into a film, The Catch by Nagisa Oshima in 1961. Another early novella, later translated as Nip the Buds, Shoot the Kids, focused on young children living in Arcadian transformations of Ōe's own rural Shikoku childhood. Ōe identified these child figures as belonging to the 'child god' archetype of Jung and Kerényi, which is characterised by abandonment, hermaphrodism, invincibility, and association with beginning and end. The first two characteristics are present in these early stories, while the latter two features come to the fore in the 'idiot boy' stories which appeared after the birth of his son Hikari. 

Between 1958 and 1961 Ōe published a series of works incorporating sexual metaphors for the occupation of Japan. He summarised the common theme of these stories as "the relationship of a foreigner as the big power [Z], a Japanese who is more or less placed in a humiliating position [X], and, sandwiched between the two, the third party [Y] (sometimes a prostitute who caters only to foreigners or an interpreter)". In each of these works, the Japanese X is inactive, failing to take the initiative to resolve the situation and showing no psychological or spiritual development. The graphically sexual nature of this group of stories prompted a critical outcry; Ōe said of the culmination of the series Our Times, "I personally like this novel [because] I do not think I will ever write another novel which is filled only with sexual words."

In 1961, Ōe's novellas Seventeen and The Death of a Political Youth were published in the Japanese literary magazine Bungakukai. Both were inspired by seventeen-year-old Yamaguchi Otoya, who had assassinated Japan Socialist Party chairman Inejirō Asanuma in October 1960, and then killed himself in prison three weeks later. Yamaguchi had admirers among the extreme right wing who were angered by The Death of a Political Youth and both Ōe and the magazine received death threats day and night for weeks. The magazine soon apologized to offended readers, but Ōe did not, and he was later physically assaulted by an angry right-winger while giving a speech at Tokyo University.

Ōe's next phase moved away from sexual content, shifting this time toward the violent fringes of society. The works which he published between 1961 and 1964 are influenced by existentialism and picaresque literature, populated with more or less criminal rogues and anti-heroes whose position on the fringes of society allows them to make pointed criticisms of it. Ōe's admission that Mark Twain's Huckleberry Finn is his favorite book can be said to find a context in this period.

Influence of Hikari

Ōe credited his son Hikari for influencing his literary career. Ōe tried to give his son a "voice" through his writing. Several of Ōe's books feature a character based on his son.

In Ōe's 1964 book, A Personal Matter, the writer describes the psychological trauma involved in accepting his brain-damaged son into his life. Hikari figures prominently in many of the books singled out for praise by the Nobel committee, and his life is the core of the first book published after Ōe was awarded the Nobel Prize. The 1996 book, A Healing Family, celebrates the small victories in Hikari's life.

Hikari was a strong influence on Father, Where are you Going?, Teach Us to Outgrow Our Madness, and The Day He Himself Shall Wipe My Tears Away, three novels which rework the same premise—the father of a disabled son attempts to recreate the life of his own father, who shut himself away and died. The protagonist's ignorance of his father is compared to his son's inability to understand him; the lack of information about his father's story makes the task impossible to complete, but capable of endless repetition, and, "repetition becomes the fabric of the stories."

2006 to 2008
In 2005, two retired Japanese military officers sued Ōe for libel for his 1970 book of essays, Okinawa Notes, in which he had written that members of the Japanese military had coerced masses of Okinawan civilians into committing suicide during the Allied invasion of the island in 1945. In March 2008, the Osaka District Court dismissed all charges against Ōe. In this ruling, Judge Toshimasa Fukami stated, "The military was deeply involved in the mass suicides". In a news conference following the trial, Ōe said, "The judge accurately read my writing."

Ōe did not write much during the nearly two years (2006–2008) of his libel case. He began writing a new novel, which The New York Times reported would feature a character "based on his father," a staunch supporter of the imperial system who drowned in a flood during World War II.

2013
Bannen Yoshikishu, his final novel, is the sixth in a series with the main character of Kogito Choko, who can be considered Ōe's literary alter ego. The novel is also in a sense a culmination of the I-novels that Ōe continued to write since his son was born mentally disabled in 1963. In the novel, Choko loses interest in the novel he had been writing when the Great East Japan earthquake and tsunami struck the Tohoku region on 11 March 2011. Instead, he begins writing about an age of catastrophe, as well as about the fact that he himself was approaching his late 70s.

Activism 
In 1959 and 1960, Ōe participated in the Anpo protests against the U.S.-Japan Security Treaty as a member of a group of young writers, artists, and composers called the "Young Japan Society" (Wakai Nihon no Kai). The treaty allowed the United States to maintain military bases in Japan, and Ōe's disappointment at the failure of the protests to stop the treaty shaped his future writing.
Ōe was involved with pacifist and anti-nuclear campaigns and wrote books regarding the atomic bombings of Hiroshima and Nagasaki and the Hibakusha. After meeting prominent anti-nuclear activist Noam Chomsky at a Harvard degree ceremony, Ōe began his correspondence with Chomsky by sending him a copy of his Okinawa Notes. While also discussing Ōe's Okinawa Notes, Chomsky's reply included a story from his childhood. Chomsky wrote that when he first heard about the atomic bombing of Hiroshima, he could not bear it being celebrated, and he went in the woods and sat alone until the evening. Ōe later said in an interview, "I've always respected Chomsky, but I respected him even more after he told me that."

Following the 2011 Fukushima nuclear disaster, he urged Prime Minister Yoshihiko Noda to "halt plans to restart nuclear power plants and instead abandon nuclear energy". Ōe said Japan has an "ethical responsibility" to abandon nuclear power in the aftermath of the Fukushima nuclear disaster, just as it renounced war under its postwar Constitution. He called for "an immediate end to nuclear power generation and warned that Japan would suffer another nuclear catastrophe if it tries to resume nuclear power plant operations". In 2013, he organized a mass demonstration in Tokyo against nuclear power. Ōe also criticized moves to amend Article 9 of the Constitution, which forever renounces war.

Personal life and death 
Ōe married in February 1960. His wife, Yukari, was the daughter of film director Mansaku Itami and sister of film director Juzo Itami. The same year he met Mao Zedong on a trip to China. He also went to Russia and Europe the following year, visiting Sartre in Paris.

Ōe lived in Tokyo and had three children. In 1963, his eldest son, Hikari, was born with a brain hernia. Ōe initially struggled to accept his son's condition, which required surgery which would leave him with learning disabilities for life. Hikari lived with Kenzaburō and Yukari until he was middle-aged, and often composed music in the same room where his father was writing.

Ōe died on 3 March 2023, at age 88.

Honors

Nobel Prize in Literature and Japan's Order of Culture 
In 1994 Ōe won the Nobel Prize in Literature and was named to receive Japan's Order of Culture. He refused the latter because it is bestowed by the Emperor. Ōe said, "I do not recognize any authority, any value, higher than democracy." Once again, he received threats.

Shortly after learning that he had been awarded the Nobel Prize, Ōe said that he was encouraged by the Swedish Academy's recognition of modern Japanese literature, and hoped that it would inspire other writers. He told The New York Times that his writing was ultimately focused on "the dignity of human beings."

Major awards 
Tokyo University May Festival Prize, 1957.
Akutagawa Prize, 1958.
Shinchosha Literary Prize, 1964.
Tanizaki Prize, 1967.
Noma Prize, 1973.
Yomiuri Prize, 1982.
Jiro Osaragi Prize (Asahi Shimbun), 1983.
Nobel Prize in Literature, 1994.
Order of Culture, 1994 – refused.
Legion of Honour, 2002.

Eponymous literary prize 
In 2005, the Kenzaburō Ōe Prize was established by publisher Kodansha to promote Japanese literary novels internationally, with the first prize awarded in 2007. The winning work was selected solely by Ōe, to be translated into English, French, or German, and published worldwide.

Selected works
The number of Kenzaburō Ōe's works translated into English and other languages remains limited, so that much of his literary output is still only available in Japanese. The few translations have often appeared after a marked lag in time. Work of his has also been translated into Chinese, French, and German.

In a statistical overview of writings by and about Kenzaburō Ōe, OCLC/WorldCat encompasses roughly 700 works in 1,500+ publications in 28 languages and 27,000+ library holdings.

See also

List of Japanese Nobel laureates
List of Nobel laureates affiliated with the University of Tokyo
Anti-nuclear power movement in Japan
Relocation of Marine Corps Air Station Futenma

Notes

References
Ōe, Kenzaburō. (1968). Ōe Kenzaburō Zensakuhin (Complete Works of Oe Kenzaburo).Tokyo: Shinchosha.
_. (1978). Shosetsu no hoho (The Method of a Novel). Tokyo: Iwanami.
Wilson, Michiko N. (1986). The Marginal World of Ōe Kenzaburō: A Study in Themes and Techniques. Armonk, New York: M. E. Sharpe.  (cloth)  (paper)
Oe, K. (2007, Winter). The Art of Fiction No. 195 [Interview by S. Fay]. Retrieved 23 April 2019, from https://www.theparisreview.org/interviews/5816/kenzaburo-oe-the-art-of-fiction-no-195-kenzaburo-oe

Further reading
Kimura, Akio. (2007) Faulkner and Oe: The Self-Critical Imagination. Lanham, Maryland: University Press of America.
Rapp, Rayne and Faye Ginsburg. "Enabling Disability: Rewriting Kinship, Reimagining Citizenship." (Archive) Public Culture. Volume 13, Issue 3. p. 533–556.
Ueda, Hozumi (上田 穗積 Ueda Hozumi). "Mice and Elephants, or Forests and Prairies : A Comparison of Ohe Kenzaburoh and Murakami Haruki" (鼠と象、あるいは森と平原 : 大江健三郎と村上春樹)  National Institute of Informatics (NII) Article ID (NAID) :40019369258. NII NACSIS-CAT ID (NCID) :AN10074725. . Journal Type :大学紀要. NDL Article ID :023863147. NDL Source Classification :ZV1(一般学術誌—一般学術誌・大学紀要). NDL Call No. :Z22-1315. Databases : NDL
Wilson, Michiko N. (2007). ″Kenzaburo Ôe: Laughing Prophet and Soulful Healer,″ on the official Nobel Foundation Website, The Nobel Prize in Literature 1994

External links

List of Works
Kenzaburō Ōe Prize

1935 births
2023 deaths
20th-century Japanese novelists
20th-century Japanese short story writers
21st-century Japanese novelists
21st-century Japanese short story writers
Academic staff of the Free University of Berlin
Akutagawa Prize winners
Battle of Okinawa
Existentialists
Japanese anti–nuclear power activists
Japanese anti–nuclear weapons activists
Japanese essayists
Japanese male short story writers
Japanese Nobel laureates
Japanese psychological fiction writers
Japanese science fiction writers
Magic realism writers
Nobel laureates in Literature
People from Ehime Prefecture
Princeton University faculty
Recipients of the Legion of Honour
University of Tokyo alumni
Writers from Ehime Prefecture
Yomiuri Prize winners